Michael Fitzmaurice (born 13 January 1967) is an Irish former Gaelic footballer. His league and championship career at senior level with the Mayo county team lasted five seasons from 1989 until 1993.

Fitzmaurice made his debut on the inter-county scene when he was chosen for the Mayo minor team. He was captain of the side in 1985 and claimed an All-Ireland medal following a defeat of Cork. He subsequently lined out with the Mayo under-21 team. Fitzmaurice made his senior debut during the 1988-89 league. He was a regular on the starting fifteen over the next five years and won one Connacht medal. He was an All-Ireland runner-up in 1989. He finished the 1989 championship as the top scorer Fitzmaurice played his last game for Mayo in March 1993

Career statistics

Honours
 Mayo
 Connacht Senior Football Championship (1): 1989

References

1958 births
Living people
Lacken Gaelic footballers
Mayo inter-county Gaelic footballers